Katraj Ghat is a mountain pass located on the southern outskirts of the city of Pune in Maharashtra, India. Katraj Ghat has a history of more than 400 years; it was used during the time of chhatrapati Shivaji maharaj . A New Katraj Tunnel new tunnel of 6 lanes is constructed to bypass this ghat.

Road
Katraj Ghat begins at the south of Katraj village. At the southern end of the ghat, the new alignment of NH4 through the New Katraj Tunnel merges with the old alignment of the highway.

References

Mountain passes of Maharashtra